Bosnia and Herzegovina is located in Southeastern Europe, in the western Balkans. It has a  border with Croatia to the north and southwest, a  border with Serbia to the east, and a  border with Montenegro to the southeast. It borders the Adriatic Sea along its  coastline.

The country is mostly mountainous, encompassing the central Dinaric Alps. The northeastern parts reach into the Pannonian basin, while in the south it borders the Adriatic Sea.

The country's natural resources include coal, iron ore, bauxite, manganese, nickel, clay, gypsum, salt, sand, timber and hydropower.

Regions

The country's name comes from the two regions Bosnia and Herzegovina, which have a very vaguely defined border between them. Bosnia occupies the northern areas which are roughly four fifths of the entire country, while Herzegovina occupies the rest in the southern part of the country.

The major cities are the capital Sarajevo, Banja Luka and Bihać in the northwest region known as Bosanska Krajina, Tuzla in the northeast, Zenica in the central part of Bosnia and Mostar is the capital of Herzegovina.

The south part of Bosnia has Mediterranean climate and a great deal of agriculture. Central Bosnia is the most mountainous part of Bosnia featuring prominent mountains Vlašić, Čvrsnica, and Prenj. Eastern Bosnia also features mountains like Trebević, Jahorina, Igman, Bjelašnica and Treskavica. It was here that the 1984 Winter Olympics were held.

Eastern Bosnia is heavily forested along the river Drina, and overall close to 50% of Bosnia and Herzegovina is forested. Most forest areas are in Central, Eastern and Western parts of Bosnia. Northern Bosnia contains very fertile agricultural land along the river Sava and the corresponding area is heavily farmed. This farmland is a part of the Parapannonian Plain stretching into neighbouring Croatia and Serbia. The river Sava and corresponding Posavina river basin hold the cities of Brčko, Bosanski Šamac, Bosanski Brod and Bosanska Gradiška.

The northwest part of Bosnia is called Bosanska Krajina and holds the cities of Banja Luka, Prijedor, Sanski Most, Jajce, Cazin, Velika Kladuša and Bihać. Kozara National Park and Mrakovica World War II monument is located in this region.

The country has only  of coastline, around the town of Neum in the Herzegovina-Neretva Canton, although surrounded by Croatian peninsulas it is possible to get to the middle of the Adriatic from Neum. By United Nations law, Bosnia has a right of passage to the outer sea. Neum has many hotels and is an important tourism destination.

Rivers

There are seven major rivers of Bosnia and Herzegovina:

The Una in the northwest part of Bosnia flows along the northern and western border of Bosnia and Croatia and through the Bosnian city of Bihać. It is popular for rafting and adventure sports.
The Sana flows through the city of Sanski Most and Prijedor and is a tributary of the river Una in the north.
The Vrbas flows through the cities of Gornji Vakuf – Uskoplje, Bugojno, Jajce, Banja Luka, Srbac and reaches the river Sava in the north. The Vrbas flows through the central part of Bosnia and flows outwards to the North.
The Bosna is the longest river in Bosnia and is fully contained within the country as it stretches from its source near Sarajevo to the river Sava in the north. It gave its name to the country.
The Drina flows through the eastern part of Bosnia, at many places in the border between Bosnia and Serbia. The Drina flows through the cities of Foča, Goražde Višegrad and Zvornik.
The Neretva is the longest river in Herzegovina, flowing from Jablanica south to the Adriatic Sea. The river is famous as it flows through the city of Mostar.

The Sava is the longest river in Bosnia and Herzegovina. However, within Bosnia and Herzegovina, it only runs along the border with Croatia. It then flows into Serbia. Towns like Brčko, Bosanski Šamac, and Bosanska Gradiška lie on the river.

Phytogeography

Phytogeographically, Bosnia and Herzegovina belongs to the Boreal Kingdom and is shared between the Illyrian province of the Circumboreal Region and Adriatic province of the Mediterranean Region. According to the WWF, the territory of Bosnia and Herzegovina can be subdivided into three ecoregions: the Pannonian mixed forests, Dinaric Mountains mixed forests and Illyrian deciduous forests.

Climate 
The western and southern parts of the country have a transitional Mediterranean climate.

The hills and mountains are drier, colder, windier, and cloudier.

The north region has a typical continental climate.

Climate change

Mining industry 
 
Various archaeological artifacts including relicts of mining activities and tools belonging to similar age groups, provide an indication of the geographical distribution, scale and methods of mining activities in Bosnia and Herzegovina during the Paleolithic to Roman era.

Most important of these is the so-called area of “central Bosnian mountains” located between the rivers Vrbas, Lašva, Neretva, Rama and their tributaries. The second one is the area of western Bosnia, bordered by the Vrbas and Una rivers, with its main orebearing formations found in the river-valleys of Sana and Japra, and their tributaries. The third area is eastern Bosnia, around the river Drina between the towns of Foča and Zvornik, the principal mining activity centered around Srebrenica.

Ores of various metals, including iron, are found in these areas and exploitation has been going on for more than 5000 years – from the period of prehistoric human settlers, through Illyrian, Roman, Slavic, Turkish and Austrian rulers, into the present.

Land use 
Arable land: 19.73%
Permanent crops: 2.06%
Other: 78.22% (2012 est.)

Irrigated land:  (2003)

Total renewable water resources:  (2011)

Environment 

Natural hazards:
Destructive earthquakes

Current issues:
Air pollution from metallurgical plants
Sites for disposing of urban waste are limited
Widespread casualties, water shortages, and destruction of infrastructure because of the 1992–95 war
Deforestation

International agreements:
Party to: Air Pollution, Biodiversity, Climate Change, Desertification, Hazardous Wastes, Law of the Sea, Marine Life Conservation, Nuclear Test Ban, Ozone Layer Protection, Wetlands
Signed, but not ratified: none

Gallery

See also
Environment of Bosnia and Herzegovina
Geography of Europe
List of cities in Bosnia and Herzegovina

References

Notes